Li Chuan Yun (李傳韻; born 1980), also known as Chanyun Li or Babeli, is a Chinese violin virtuoso. He began studying violin at the age of three and won his first prize in Beijing when he was five. Li performed all the violin solos for the 2002 film Together and also starred in the film.

Biography
Born to a musical family in the coastal city of Qingdao in Northern China, Li's career began at the age of three, when his parents taught him to play the violin at home.

At five, Li won his first championship at Beijing Youth and Junior Violin Competition. At eleven, he received the top award at the Fifth Wieniawski International Youth Violin Competition, becoming the youngest winner in the competition's history.

Professor Lin Yaoji from the Central Conservatory of Music, recalls the first time he listened to six-year-old Li Chuanyun: "I didn't take it seriously at first, a six-year-old playing Lalo, I just dismissed it. But once the boy started playing, I saw huge talent. I was amazed." Li studied at the Central Conservatory of Music in Beijing for 10 years before beginning studies at the Juilliard School in 1996.

At Juilliard, Li studied with Dorothy DeLay, Itzhak Perlman and Hyo Kang; he later continued his study with Delay and Kurt Sassmannshaus at the University of Cincinnati Conservatory of Music.

Professor Kurt Sassmannshaus commented, "It's very rare that one person has the ability to transform a musical idea immediately into sound. Most people have to think about the technique. But Li Chuanyun just plays."

Instruments
Li has performed on a 1784 Guadagnini on extended loan from the Stradivari Society. He also performed with the following violins from the Stradivari Society in recording Stradivari Campaign.
 "Lobkowitz" Amati of 1617 ($1,000,000)
 "Ruby" Stradivarius of 1708 ($5,000,000)
 "La Cathedral" Stradivarius of 1707 ($5,000,000)
 "Sloane" Guarneri of 1742 ($4,000,000)
 "Lenora Jackson" Stradivarius of 1714 ($5,000,000)
 "Mantua-Ricci" Balestreri of 1771 ($4,500,000)
 Osborn 1766

Discography
 Paganini 24 Caprices (4-CD set, 1993 Hong Kong recordings and 2007 Beijing recordings), 
 Violin Operas
 Romantic Moments, 
 Love Capriccio, 
 Prophetic Birds
 Stradivari Campaign, 
 The Rebirth of Great Violin
 La Ronde des Lutins (POLOARTS, 2005), 
 Salut D'Amour, Strauss Violin Sonata, and Favourite Encores (Hänssler Classics, 2004)

Films
Li Chuanyun famously performed and starred in director Chen Kaige's movie Together in 2002. The story relates the love between a father and a son who plays the violin. Li performed and recorded the soundtrack's solo violin music, which the Washington Post described as "ethereal playing…which has given the movie such a magnificent aural backdrop."

In 2004, Li appeared in a documentary series of Radio Television Hong Kong of outstanding young Chinese musicians along with Lang Lang, Li Yundi, Jian Wang, Xuan Zhang, and others.

Awards
 At age 5, he won his first championship at the Beijing Youth and Junior Violin Competition.
 In 1991, at age 11, he received the top award at the Fifth Wieniawski International Youth Violin Competition by the unanimous vote of 20 judges from 11 countries; he is the youngest winner in the competition's history.
 In 1998, at age 17, he won the first prize of Nakamichi Violin Concerto competition.
 At age 19, he won the first prize of Saint Saens Violin Concerto competition.
 In 2008, he won the China Gold Record award.
 In 2009, he won the Best Artist Award of Hong Kong Arts Development Council.

References

External links
Archived website of Chuanyun Li
Chuanyun Li biography at Violin Masterclass
Chuanyun Li (age 11) plays Bach Partita No. 3
Chuanyun Li plays Carmen Fantasy in 1991 Wieniawski Competition
Chuanyun Li plays Czardas by Monti 
Chuanyun Li plays Zigeunerweisen by Sarasate
Chuanyun Li plays Beethoven Violin Concerto in D major, Op. 61
Chuanyun Li plays La Ronde Des Lutins

Living people
1980 births
People with acquired permanent residency of Hong Kong
Chinese classical violinists
21st-century classical violinists
Musicians from Qingdao